The 1979 United Nations Security Council election was held from 26 October 1979 to 7 January 1980 during the Thirty-fourth session of the United Nations General Assembly, held at United Nations Headquarters in New York City. The General Assembly elected East Germany, Mexico, Niger, the Philippines, and Tunisia, as the five new non-permanent members of the UN Security Council for two-year mandates commencing January 1980. Taking 155 rounds of voting to resolve, it remains the longest Security Council election in history. Additionally, this was the first time Niger was elected and the only time East Germany was elected member of the Council.

Rules
The Security Council has 15 seats, filled by five permanent members and ten non-permanent members. Each year, half of the non-permanent members are elected for two-year terms. A sitting member may not immediately run for re-election.

In accordance with the rules whereby the ten non-permanent UNSC seats rotate among the various regional blocs into which UN member states traditionally divide themselves for voting and representation purposes, the five available seats are allocated as follows:

Two for African countries, one of which being the "Arab Swing Seat" (held by Gabon and Nigeria)
One for the Asian Group (now the Asia-Pacific Group) (held by Kuwait)
One for Latin America and the Caribbean (held by Bolivia)
One for the Eastern European Group (held by Czechoslovakia)

To be elected, a candidate must receive a two-thirds majority of those present and voting. If the vote is inconclusive after the first round, three rounds of restricted voting shall take place, followed by three rounds of unrestricted voting, and so on, until a result has been obtained. In restricted voting, only official candidates may be voted on, while in unrestricted voting, any member of the given regional group, with the exception of current Council members, may be voted on.

Results

Day 1

Day 2

Day 3

Day 4

Day 5

Day 6

See also
List of members of the United Nations Security Council
Germany and the United Nations
Mexico and the United Nations
Philippines and the United Nations

References

External links
UN Document A/59/881 Note Verbale from the Permanent Mission of Costa Rica containing a record of Security Council elections up to 2004

1979 elections
1979
Non-partisan elections
1979 in international relations